Margary numbers are the numbering scheme developed by the historian Ivan Margary to catalogue known and suspected Roman roads in Britain in his 1955 work The Roman Roads of Britain. They remain the standard system used by archaeologists and historians to identify individual Roman roads within Britain. It is not known how the Romans identified the roads they built within Britain, and well-known names such as Watling Street and the Fosse Way largely date from the Anglo-Saxon period, are sometimes ambiguous or duplicated, and cover only a small proportion of the known network.

Margary's numbering system follows similar conventions to modern road numbering systems. He divided roads into three categories: Main Routes are given single-digit numbers, Principal Branches two-digit numbers and Minor Branches three digit numbers. Individual sections of longer routes are identified by adding letters to the route number, for example Dere Street (Margary 8) is divided into sections 8a, 8b, 8c, 8d and 8e. Double letters are sometimes used to indicate parallel or alternative routes. Lesser roads in particular areas are given similar numbers – for example many roads in Wales have numbers in the 60s.

Margary's cataloguing system has been criticised as being essentially arbitrary in several respects. Margary's hierarchy of routes is not necessarily that of the original designers or users of the network. Evidence for whether the Romans considered different lengths of road to form parts of a single route can be ambiguous, so the fact that they are given a single Margary number can be misleading. Margary's network also largely consists of roads built by the Romans, not necessarily roads used by the Romans, who may have continued to use native British trackways.

Margary's system is nonetheless widely used for its practicality, and the awarding of a Margary number to a route came to be considered a hallmark of authenticity among researchers in the field.

Main routes and principal branches

References

Bibliography
 
 
 
 

Roman roads in Britannia